Clepsis peguncus is a species of moth of the family Tortricidae. It is found in Ecuador (Papallacta Province).

The wingspan is about 16 mm. The ground colour of the forewings is pale orange, preserved in the form of two costal blotches followed by three posterior spots. The remaining area is dark brown. The hindwings are dark brownish.

Etymology
The species name refers to the shape of the uncus and is derived from Greek pegos (meaning thick).

References

Moths described in 2013
Clepsis